Diphthamide is a post-translationally modified histidine amino acid found in archaeal and eukaryotic elongation factor 2 (eEF-2).

Structure
Diphthamide is proposed to be a 2-[3-carboxyamido-3-(trimethylammonio)propyl]histidine. Though this structure has been confirmed by X-ray crystallography, its stereochemistry is uncertain.

Biological function
Diphthamide ensures translation fidelity.

The presence or absence of diphthamide is known to affect NF-κB or death receptor pathways.

Biosynthesis
Diphthamide is biosynthesized from histidine and S-adenosyl methionine.

References

Amino acids
Imidazoles
Quaternary ammonium compounds
Post-translational modification
Zwitterions